Ceratinella ornatula is a spider species native to the Canada, Greenland and the United States. It belongs to the family Linyphiidae. The species was first described by C. R. Crosby and S. C. Bishop in 1925 as Ceraticelus ornatulus.

Subspecies 
Two subspecies are recognized:
 Ceratinella ornatula alaskana Chamberlin, 1949
 Ceratinella ornatula ornatula 

Ceratinella ornatula alaskana is endemic to Alaska, United States, and was described for the first time by Chamberlin in 1949.

References 

Linyphiidae
Spiders of North America
Spiders described in 1925